Emmerik De Vriese (born 14 February 1985) is a Belgian professional footballer who plays as a midfielder for Antonia in the Belgian Provincial Leagues.

Career
Before joining OH Leuven, De Vriese played three seasons at BV Veendam in the second division in the Netherlands. He then moved to Antwerp, where he also played for three seasons before being signed by newly promoted Oud-Heverlee Leuven in 2011, where he was released in 2013.

On 8 September 2014, following a short trial period De Vriese signed for Bulgarian side Lokomotiv Plovdiv as a free agent. He rarely featured for the team and left Lokomotiv Plovdiv in the summer of 2015.

References

External links
 
 

1985 births
Living people
People from Knokke-Heist
Belgian footballers
Association football midfielders
Belgian Pro League players
Challenger Pro League players
Eerste Divisie players
First Professional Football League (Bulgaria) players
Cypriot First Division players
Cypriot Second Division players
Liga I players
SC Veendam players
Royal Antwerp F.C. players
Oud-Heverlee Leuven players
PFC Lokomotiv Plovdiv players
Ethnikos Achna FC players
Ermis Aradippou FC players
CS Gaz Metan Mediaș players
P.O. Xylotymbou players
Royal Cappellen F.C. players
Belgian expatriate footballers
Expatriate footballers in Cyprus
Belgian expatriate sportspeople in Cyprus
Expatriate footballers in the Netherlands
Belgian expatriate sportspeople in the Netherlands
Expatriate footballers in Bulgaria
Belgian expatriate sportspeople in Bulgaria
Expatriate footballers in Romania
Belgian expatriate sportspeople in Romania
Footballers from West Flanders